Kotłowo  is a settlement in the administrative district of Gmina Kępice, within Słupsk County, Pomeranian Voivodeship, in northern Poland.

The settlement has a population of 49.

References

Villages in Słupsk County